José Pedro Balmaceda Pascal (born 2 April 1975) is a Chilean-born American actor. After nearly two decades of taking small roles in film and television, Pascal rose to prominence for portraying Oberyn Martell during the fourth season of the HBO fantasy series Game of Thrones (2014) and Javier Peña in the Netflix crime series Narcos (2015–2017). Since 2019, he has starred as the title character in the Disney+ Star Wars series The Mandalorian and again in The Book of Boba Fett (2022). Since 2023, he has played Joel in the HBO drama series The Last of Us. 

Outside of television, Pascal has appeared in the films The Adjustment Bureau (2011), The Great Wall (2016), Kingsman: The Golden Circle (2017), The Equalizer 2 (2018), Triple Frontier (2019), Wonder Woman 1984 (2020), and The Unbearable Weight of Massive Talent (2022).

Early life

José Pedro Balmaceda Pascal was born on 2 April 1975, in Santiago, Chile. He is the son of child psychologist Verónica Pascal Ureta and fertility doctor José Balmaceda Riera. He has an older sister named Javiera, a younger brother named Nicolás, and a younger sister named Lux, who is an actress and transgender activist. Pascal's mother was the cousin of Andrés Pascal Allende, the nephew of socialist Chilean President Salvador Allende (through his sister Laura). Andrés was an early leader of the Movement of the Revolutionary Left, an urban guerrilla movement dedicated to the overthrow of the military dictatorship of Augusto Pinochet.

According to Pascal, his parents were devout followers of Allende and active in resistance groups against the Pinochet dictatorship. Because of this, nine months after his birth, his family sought refuge in the Venezuelan embassy in Santiago, and later received political asylum in Denmark. Ultimately, the family moved to the United States, where Pascal was raised in Orange County, California, and San Antonio, Texas. By the time he was eight years old, his family could regularly visit Chile to see his 34 cousins.

Pascal participated in competitive swimming in his early years and even reached the state championships in Texas at age 11. However, he stopped swimming competitively after discovering his interest in drama class. He pursued acting at the Orange County School of the Arts and graduated in 1993, before attending New York University's Tisch School of the Arts, where he graduated in 1997. In 1995, his father was indicted by a federal grand jury for his involvement in events at a fertility clinic he ran with two others. Following this, Pascal's father, mother, and two youngest siblings returned to Chile. Pascal maintains that his father did nothing wrong. His mother died by suicide in 1999. After her death, he began using her surname professionally as a tribute to her and because he felt that Americans had difficulty pronouncing his original surname, Balmaceda.

Career 
Pascal has appeared in several television series, including Buffy the Vampire Slayer, The Good Wife, Homeland, The Mentalist, Law & Order: Criminal Intent, Law & Order: Special Victims Unit, and Graceland. He was cast in the pilot for the 2011 Wonder Woman television adaptation, but the show was not picked up. In June 2013, he was cast as Oberyn Martell in the fourth season of the HBO series Game of Thrones. Pascal stated that he was a huge fan of Game of Thrones before being cast as Oberyn and was ecstatic to join. In 2015, Pascal was cast in the role of U.S. DEA agent Javier Peña in the Netflix original show Narcos. In the 2015 movie, Bloodsucking Bastards, Pascal portrayed the vampire Max.

Pascal has extensive stage experience as both an actor and director; he received the Los Angeles Drama Critics Circle Award and Garland Award for his role in the International City Theater production of Orphans, and has performed in classical and contemporary works. In 2010, he wrote a play, directed by Sarah Silverman, Flaca Loves Bone, about four siblings who meet in a snowy wood to uncover a family secret. He made his directorial debut with play underneathmybed in 2008. He also directed Yosemite and Killing Play at Rattlestick Playwrights Theater. He is a member of New York City's LAByrinth Theater Company. Pascal made his Broadway debut in February 2019 in an adaptation of King Lear with Glenda Jackson and Ruth Wilson.

In April 2015, Pascal co-starred with Heidi Klum in the music video for Sia's "Fire Meet Gasoline". In 2017, he starred as Agent Whiskey in Matthew Vaughn's Kingsman: The Golden Circle and as mercenary Pero Tovar in The Great Wall. In 2018, Pascal co-starred as Dave York, the primary antagonist in the thriller sequel film The Equalizer 2; the film starred Denzel Washington.

Since 2019, Pascal has portrayed the title role in The Mandalorian, the first live-action Star Wars television series, which debuted on Disney+. The same year, he starred as Francisco "Catfish" Morales in the Netflix heist drama Triple Frontier. He played Maxwell Lord in the DC Extended Universe film Wonder Woman 1984, directed by Patty Jenkins. Following delays due to the COVID-19 pandemic, the film was released to theaters and HBO Max on 25 December 2020.

In February 2021, Pascal was cast in the Judd Apatow film The Bubble. The film premiered on Netflix on 1 April 2022. Pascal co-starred with Nicolas Cage in the comedy The Unbearable Weight of Massive Talent which premiered at SXSW 2022 in April. In February 2021, Pascal was cast in the lead role of Joel Miller for the HBO adaptation of The Last of Us. Pascal reportedly received $600,000 per episode. In November 2022, he was cast in Freaky Tales, to be directed by Anna Boden and Ryan Fleck.

Personal life
Pascal is fluent in both English and Spanish and has been a resident of New York City since 1993. He developed a close friendship with actress Sarah Paulson soon after moving there.

Pascal is an advocate of LGBTQ+ rights and was supportive of his sister Lux Pascal when she came out as transgender. Lux said, "He has been an important part of this. He is also an artist and has been a guide. He was one of the first to give me the things that formed my identity."

Pascal identifies as an agnostic and a liberal. He endorsed Gabriel Boric in the 2021 Chilean presidential election.

Acting credits

Film

Television

Theatre

Music videos

Video games

References

External links

1975 births
20th-century American male actors
21st-century American male actors
Allende family
American agnostics
American LGBT rights activists
American male film actors
American male stage actors
American male television actors
American male voice actors
American people of Chilean descent
Chilean emigrants to the United States
Chilean agnostics
Hispanic and Latino American male actors
Living people
Male actors from Orange County, California
Male actors from San Antonio
Male actors from Santiago
Orange County School of the Arts alumni
Tisch School of the Arts alumni